Tessenderlo is a municipality in the Belgian province of Limburg. It is where the three Belgian provinces of Limburg, Flemish Brabant and Antwerp meet at the front gate of the Averbode Abbey. The municipality Tessenderlo encompasses the villages of Tessenderlo proper, Schoot, Engsbergen, Hulst and Berg. On January 1, 2006, Tessenderlo had a total population of 16,811. The total area is 51.35 km2 which gives a population density of 327 inhabitants per km2. The name Tessenderlo means "(the open place in) the forest of the Taxandrians".

It is along the Albert Canal and the European route E313, the highway between Antwerp and Liège, one of the reasons it was the place for the first Belgian "Industrial Zone of National Importance" in the 1960s.

Tessenderlo was the scene of an infamous industrial disaster during World War II, when a stock of 150 tonnes of ammonium nitrate at the chemical plant of Produits Chimiques de Tessenderloo (now Tessenderlo Group) - located near the centre of town - exploded on April 29, 1942, killing 189 people at the plant and in the town.

Tessenderlo is part of a small western zone of Limburg where the local dialect is not the Limburgian dialect, but Brabantic.

Notable people

 Kate Ryan, Belgian singer
 Chantal Calin, Belgian singer
 Tia Hellebaut, Olympic Champion 2008 Highjump
 Minus van Looi, writer

References

External links
 
Official website 

Municipalities of Limburg (Belgium)